Ingvald Olsen Eidsheim DSO, DSC (born 27 November 1909 in Hosanger, died 23 February 2000) was a Norwegian sailor and war hero. He joined the Shetland bus as the commander of Hitra. He conducted 43 trips to Norway.

After the war he worked as a civilian until he rejoined the Royal Norwegian Navy in 1948 and amongst other assignments commanded the Norwegian Royal Yacht Norge.

From 1950 he served on the Central Defence Command Staff and eventually headed the Norwegian Home Guard staff. Following his retirement he committed himself to the restoration of his old ship Hitra.

Honours and awards
For his war efforts he received the highest Norwegian decoration, the War Cross with Sword, the British Distinguished Service Order and Distinguished Service Cross, and the American Medal of Freedom.

On 25 August 2007 Eidsheim was honoured with a monument on the pier of Eknesvågen, Lindås. The monument was made by sculptor Arne Mæland and dedicated by Minister of Defence Anne-Grete Strøm-Erichsen.

References

External links 
 Web page on Eidsheim, from the newspaper Nordhordland, 13 march 2005
 Web page on Eidsheim and the Shetland Gang

1909 births
2000 deaths
Royal Norwegian Navy personnel of World War II
People associated with Shetland
Companions of the Distinguished Service Order
Recipients of the Distinguished Service Cross (United Kingdom)
Recipients of the War Cross with Sword (Norway)
Recipients of the Medal of Freedom
Military history of Scotland